Heartless is a Danish supernatural drama television series that premiered on Kanal 5 on 28 April 2014 and ran for two seasons.  The story centers around twins Sebastian and Sofie, played by Sebastian Jessen and Julie Zangenberg, who enroll as students of Ottsmansgaard boarding school hoping to discover the secret about their supernatural curse.

The series was released on Netflix in the United States and Canada on 1 April 2016. It premiered in the United Kingdom on Channel 4 on 30 October 2017, and thereafter moved to its foreign-language VOD service Walter Presents.

Plot summary
Raised in an orphanage, siblings Sophie and Sebastian carry a dark, fatal secret:  in order to survive they have to feed from the life energy of other people. If they do not stop in time their prey ignites and turns to ashes. Sofie and Sebastian try to find answers to what they are, which leads them to Ottmannsgaard, a gloomy and traditional boarding school. The siblings must contend with strong emotions as they experience their first serious feelings of love and passion, while resisting the urge to drain the energy of the other students and those they care about.

Cast

Main
Julie Zangenberg as Sofie. Twin sister of Sebastian.
Sebastian Jessen as Sebastian. Twin brother of Sofie.
Nicolaj Kopernikus as Rector Just. Emilie's father and Ottmannsgaard headmaster.
Allan Hyde as Pieter.
Gustav Giese as  Ditlev. Alpha male of the school.
Julie Christiansen as Emilie. Sofie's love interest.
Thomas Ernst as Frederik.
Laura Christensen as Countess Gertrud Ottmann.

Recurring
Katrine Greis-Rosenthal as Ida Just, Emilie's sister.

Episodes

Series overview

Season 1 (2014)

Season 2 (2015)

References

External links
  Heartless  at Frithiof Film
 
  Heartless at Copenhagen Film Fund
  Heartless at Danish Film Institute

2014 Danish television series debuts
2010s Danish television series
2010s LGBT-related drama television series
Danish drama television series
Danish LGBT-related television shows
Dark fantasy television series
Lesbian-related television shows
Danish-language television shows
Kanal 5 (Danish TV channel) original programming